Louis Holmes (born February 24, 1985) is a former American football defensive end. He was signed by the San Francisco 49ers as an undrafted free agent in 2008. He played college football at Arizona.

Early days
He Spent final prep season at Dillard High School (Fort Lauderdale, FL)  after attending his first three years of high school in his hometown of Memphis.

College career
Holmes totaled 265 tackles, 22.0 sacks and 50.5 tackles for loss in four collegiate seasons, spending first two years at Scottsdale Community College before transferring to the University of Arizona for his final two campaigns. He played in 12 games with 10 starts for Arizona as a senior in 2007, tallying 37 tackles, two sacks and 5.5 tackles for loss. He was named Second-team All-Pac-10  during first season at Arizona as a junior, recording 36 tackles, four sacks, five tackles for loss, two forced fumbles and one fumble recovery. He combined for 192 tackles, 16.0 sacks and 40 tackles for loss in two seasons at Scottsdale Community College, garnering NJCAA All-American, All-Regional and All-Western States Football League honors.

Professional career

San Francisco 49ers
Holmes was signed by the San Francisco 49ers as a rookie free agent on May 1, 2008.

Los Angeles KISS
On January 23, 2015, Holmes was assigned to the Los Angeles KISS.

External links

1985 births
Living people
Players of American football from Memphis, Tennessee
Players of American football from Fort Lauderdale, Florida
American football defensive ends
Scottsdale Fighting Artichokes football players
Arizona Wildcats football players
San Francisco 49ers players
Tampa Bay Buccaneers players
Sacramento Mountain Lions players
Spokane Shock players
Los Angeles Kiss players